The Municipal District of Greenview No. 16 is a municipal district (MD) in northwest Alberta, Canada. Its administrative office is located in the Town of Valleyview.

History
Human settlement of the area now forming Greenview occurred millennia ago with archaeological evidence of native peoples in the Grande Cache area dating back over 10,000 years.

Modern settlement occurred predominantly in the early twentieth century throughout the municipal district. Settlers and homesteaders followed various trails to found homesteads and early communities including DeBolt, Ridgevalley, and Grovedale. During the initial influx, the Edson to Grande Prairie Trail was a common route for many settlers reaching the north and east sections of Greenview.

In 1968 three improvement districts, formerly 110,111 and 126, were conglomerated to establish Improvement District 16. As an Improvement District it was initially administered under Alberta's Department of Municipal Affairs. In 1996 Improvement District 16 became the MD of Greenview No. 16 and was fully self-governed.

In January 2019, the former Town of Grande Cache was dissolved, becoming a hamlet under the jurisdiction of Greenview.

Geography
Greenview covers a landmass with an area of 32,984.24 square kilometres and contains several geographic formations. Its westernmost portion runs along the Alberta – British Columbia border and is part of the Canadian Rockies. Its northern portion is located in Peace Country while most of the south and interior is boreal forest. The Wapiti River makes up a portion of the boundary between the County of Grande Prairie No. 1 and Greenview which also includes the Simmonette, Smoky and Little Smoky River valleys. Numerous lakes are located in Greenview. Some of the most notable are Sturgeon, Musreau, and Swan Lake as well as a portion of Snipe Lake in its northeasternmost corner.
 
The MD encompasses two other municipalities: the towns of Valleyview and Fox Creek as well as three reserves administered by the Sturgeon Lake Cree Nation. Greenview, in turn, is immediately neighboured by six municipalities, Wilmore Wilderness Park in the southwest and British Columbia. Grande Cache was formerly a third town within the MD until its dissolution. The town became a hamlet within Greenview on January 1, 2019.
 
Lying on part of the Western Canadian Sedimentary Basin which includes some of the largest coal and oil deposits in the world, Greenview is well known for its oil and gas-rich geology. The Hamlet of DeBolt gives its name to the Debolt Formation. Geothermal reservoirs are also abundant in certain parts of the municipal district.

Communities and localities 
The following urban municipalities are surrounded by the MD of Greenview No. 16.
Cities
none
Towns
Fox Creek
Valleyview
Villages
none
Summer villages
none

The following hamlets are located within the MD of Greenview No. 16.
Hamlets
Grande Cache
DeBolt 
Grovedale
Landry Heights
Little Smoky
Ridgevalley

The following localities are located within the MD of Greenview No. 16.
Localities 

Amundson
Aspen Grove
Botten
Braaten
Calais
Clarkson Valley
Cosy Cove
Crooked Creek
Denard
Dorscheid
East Grove
Goodwin
Grande Cache Lake
Grey
Grizzly
Hilltop
Kaybob

Latornell
Little Smoky River
Muskeg River
The Narrows
New Fish Creek
Owen
Pass Creek
Sturgeon Heights
Sturgeon Lake Settlement
Sunset House
Susa Creek
Sweathouse Creek
Thordarson
Tolstad
Two Creeks
Wapiti
Winniandy

Other places
Wanyandie Flats

Demographics 

In the 2016 Census of Population conducted by Statistics Canada, the MD of Greenview No. 16 had a population of 5,583 living in 2,067 of its 2,473 total private dwellings, a  change from its 2011 population of 5,299.

The MD of Greenview No. 16's 2013 municipal census counted a population of 5,242, a  change from its 2000 municipal census population of 5,516.

Economy
Oil and gas is the main economic driver in the MD, along with forestry and agriculture.

Attractions

DeBolt and District Pioneer Museum 
Kakwa Wildlands Park
Musreau Lake
O'Brien Provincial Park
Pierre Grey's Lakes Provincial Park
Sturgeon Lake
Willmore Wilderness Park

Government

Municipal politics
The MD of Greenview No. 16 is governed in accordance with Alberta's Municipal Government Act. Residents elect 8 ward councillors every four years.

Provincial politics
Greenview is served by the provincial electoral divisions of Grande Prairie – Smoky, Grande Prairie – Wapiti and, West Yellowhead. 
Following the 2015 Alberta general election the major provincial parties had one representative each.

Federal politics
Greenview is served by the federal electoral divisions of Grande Prairie Mackenzie, Peace River- Westlock and Yellowhead. All three are currently represented by members of the Conservative Party.

Infrastructure
As part of the CANAMEX Corridor, the presence of Highway 43 within the MD makes Greenview an important industry travel route. The Bighorn Highway (Highway 40) as well as Highway 49 also play a large role in making the area a major transportation route for the north of the province.  
Several small airports and heliports are in the area including the Valleyview Airport, Fox Creek Airport and DeBolt Aerodrome. They predominantly serve industry and medical facilities in the area with light aircraft.

See also 
List of communities in Alberta
List of municipal districts in Alberta

References

External links 

 
Greenview